Elections to Banbridge District Council were held on 30 May 1973 on the same day as the other Northern Irish local government elections. The election used two district electoral areas to elect a total of 15 councillors.

Election results

Districts summary

|- class="unsortable" align="centre"
!rowspan=2 align="left"|Ward
! % 
!Cllrs
! % 
!Cllrs
! %
!Cllrs
!rowspan=2|TotalCllrs
|- class="unsortable" align="center"
!colspan=2 bgcolor="" | UUP
!colspan=2 bgcolor="" | SDLP
!colspan=2 bgcolor="white"| Others
|-
|align="left"|Area A
|bgcolor="40BFF5"|57.3
|bgcolor="40BFF5"|4
|0.0
|0
|42.7
|3
|7
|-
|align="left"|Area B
|bgcolor="40BFF5"|72.2
|bgcolor="40BFF5"|7
|15.4
|1
|12.4
|0
|8
|- class="unsortable" class="sortbottom" style="background:#C9C9C9"
|align="left"| Total
|65.0
|11
|8.0
|1
|27.0
|3
|15
|-
|}

Districts results

Area A

1973: 4 x UUP, 2 x Independent Nationalist, 1 x Independent Unionist

Area B

1973: 7 x UUP, 1 x SDLP

References

Banbridge District Council elections
Banbridge